The Blue Line is a Bay Area Rapid Transit (BART) line in the San Francisco Bay Area that runs between Dublin/Pleasanton station and Daly City station. It has 18 stations in Dublin, Pleasanton, Castro Valley, San Leandro, Oakland, San Francisco, and Daly City.

History
Of BART's five primary rapid transit services, the Blue Line was the most recent to open. Service began when the Dublin/Pleasanton extension opened on May 10, 1997. The  infill station was added to the line on February 19, 2011.

SFO/Millbrae extension service

When the SFO/Millbrae extension opened on June 22, 2003, BART extended the Blue Line to SFO. San Mateo County is not a member of the San Francisco Bay Area Rapid Transit District, so SamTrans funded the county's BART service. When the extension's lower-than-expected ridership caused SamTrans to accrue deficits, BART agreed to SamTrans' request to operate only this line south of Daly City effective September 12, 2005.

SamTrans and BART reached an agreement in February 2007 in which SamTrans would transfer control and financial responsibility of the SFO/Millbrae extension to BART, in return for BART receiving additional fixed funding from SamTrans and other sources. BART has since again increased service south of Daly City, but this line now terminates at Daly City.

2019–2022 changes

On February 11, 2019, the Blue Line began operating between MacArthur station and Dublin/Pleasanton station on Sundays. The change was to allow single-tracking in the Market Street Subway during electrical work, with only the Yellow Line running through the Transbay Tube to serve San Francisco. 

Sunday service to San Francisco and Daly City resumed on February 16, 2020. From February 16, 2020 to September 13, 2020, and again from March 22, 2021 to August 1, 2021, trains terminated at Montgomery station during single-tracking work. From September 14, 2020 to March 21, 2021, and again from August 2, 2021 onwards, trains terminate at  during single-tracking work.

Stations

References

Blue Line (BART)
Railway lines in highway medians
1997 establishments in California
Railway lines opened in 1997